Assadollah Rashidian was an Iranian businessman and anglophile who, along with his brothers, played a critical role in the 1953 overthrow of Iranian Prime Minister Mohammed Mossadegh.  He was a principal covert agent of the British Secret Intelligence Service (SIS) and through him the U.S. Central Intelligence Agency (CIA) was able to convince the Shah, Mohammed Reza Pahlavi, to endorse the operation (codenamed Operation Ajax).

Rashidian's main contributions to the operation were his encouragement of the Shah's sister, Princess Ashraf Pahlavi, to obtain her brother's approval of the plan, and acting as a liaison between the SIS/CIA team and the Shah once the operation was underway. On 13 October 1952 the government issued arrest warrants for Assadollah Rashidian, his brother, Abdol Hossein Hejazi, and others. They were soon released.

References

MI6 operatives in Iran
National Will Party politicians
Members of the 20th Iranian Majlis
Deputies of Tehran for National Consultative Assembly
1919 births

1980 deaths
Year of death uncertain
Iranian emigrants to the United Kingdom
Iranian business executives